Peter John "Pete" Lappin (born December 31, 1965) is a former professional ice hockey player who played for the Minnesota North Stars and San Jose Sharks of the NHL.  Prior to his professional career, he served as co-captain of the St. Lawrence University Skating Saints. His son Nick plays within the St. Louis Blues organization

Career statistics

Regular season and playoffs

Awards and honors

References

External links
 

1965 births
Living people
American men's ice hockey right wingers
Calgary Flames draft picks
Ice hockey players from Illinois
Kalamazoo Wings (1974–2000) players
Kansas City Blades players
Minnesota North Stars players
National Hockey League supplemental draft picks
People from St. Charles, Illinois
St. Lawrence Saints men's ice hockey players
Salt Lake Golden Eagles (IHL) players
San Jose Sharks players
AHCA Division I men's ice hockey All-Americans